David Sydney Rowe-Beddoe, Baron Rowe-Beddoe,  (born 19 December 1937) is a Welsh businessman, a life peer and a crossbench member of the House of Lords. Lord Rowe-Beddoe is a former chairman of the Welsh Development Agency, and was chairman of Cardiff Airport until November 2016.

Early life
David Rowe-Beddoe is the son of Sydney Rowe Beddoe and Gwendolan Evans.

Rowe-Beddoe's early education was at The Cathedral School, Llandaff near Cardiff in Wales where he won the Victor Ludorum in 1951.  He attended Stowe School at Buckingham, Buckinghamshire in England, and St John's College, Cambridge.

In 1964, Rowe-Beddoe married Malinda Collison, and the union produced three daughters. The couple were divorced in 1982. He remarried in 1984, to Madeleine Harrison.

Career
Rowe-Beddoe's career in business began at Thomas De La Rue in 1961; and he rose to the position of Chief Executive from 1971 through 1976.  At Revlon, he was president, Latin America, Europe, Middle East and Africa from 1976 through 1981.  He also served as president, Morgan Stanley-GFTA Ltd from 1983 through 1991.

Rowe-Beddoe was known as a Monaco-based businessman and a Tory party fund-raiser when an opportunity arose for him to be appointed to a Welsh quango; and that opportunity led to others. Rowe-Beddoe was appointed chairman of the Welsh Development Agency (WDA) in July 1993; and the term of this appointment was nine years. In part because of his WDA service, he was invested as a Knight Bachelor in 2000.

In 2001, Sir David Rowe-Beddoe was appointed the Chairman of the Wales Millennium Centre; and he remains in this post today.

In 2004, Sir David Rowe-Beddoe was appointed president of the Royal Welsh College of Music and Drama having previously been a governor and chairman of the board.

In 2005, he received the Beacon Prize for Wales for his contribution to the economic and social development of Wales.
 
On 15 June 2006, he was created a life peer as Baron Rowe-Beddoe, of Kilgetty in the County of Dyfed.

In April 2007, Lord Rowe-Beddoe was created Pro-Chancellor of the University of Glamorgan.

Lord Rowe-Beddoe is a former Deputy Chair of the UK Statistics Authority who held responsibility for the governance of the Office for National Statistics.

An Anglican, Lord Rowe-Beddoe was chairman of the Representative Body of The Church in Wales from 2002 to 2012.

Honours

 Cardiff University, Honorary fellow, 1999.
 University of Wales, Honorary degree (DScEcon), 2004.
 Order of the Rising Sun, Gold Rays with Neck Ribbon, 2008.
 University of Glamorgan, Honorary Doctor
 University of Aberystwith, Honorary fellow
 UWIC, Honorary Fellow
 UWCN, Honorary Fellow
 Deputy Lieutenant of Gwent

Arms

Notes

References
 Hill, Stephen, Brian Morgan and David Rowe-Beddoe. (1998).  Inward Investment, Business Finance and Regional Development, Houndmills, Basingstoke, Hampshire: Macmillan.  ; OCLC 39861489
 Jones, Bill.  Political Issues in Britain Today. Manchester: Manchester University Press. ; OCLC  41017782

People's peers 
People associated with the Royal Welsh College of Music & Drama
Living people
1937 births
Alumni of St John's College, Cambridge
People educated at The Cathedral School, Llandaff
Deputy Lieutenants of Gwent
Knights Bachelor
Recipients of the Order of the Rising Sun, 3rd class
British expatriates in Monaco
Crossbench life peers
Life peers created by Elizabeth II
People educated at Stowe School